Fiddletown may refer to:

Fiddletown, New South Wales, Australia
Fiddletown, California, United States
Fiddletown AVA, California wine region in Amador County